Haplomitrium kashyapii is a liverwort from India.

References

Plants described in 1982
Flora of India (region)
Calobryales